is a Japanese actor, TV personality, and artist from Kisarazu, Chiba. Nakao is represented by the Furutachi Project agency.

Biography
Nakao attended Chiba Prefectural Kisarazu High School from 1958, and entered Musashino Art University from 1961. Also in 1961, he was selected in the "5th Nikkatsu New Face" talent competition.

In 1963, he left Musashino Art University to study in Paris, France. On returning to Japan in 1964, he enrolled in the  theatre company, where he studied under Jūkichi Uno. In 1971, he left the Mingei theatre group to work as a freelance actor.

In 1978, he married actress Shino Ikenami, the daughter of rakugo comedian Kingentei Basho. They received the "Nice Couple Award" in 2008.

In 1988, he started studying ceramics under Masaaki Kosugi in Karatsu, Saga.

Acting career
Nakao has appeared in jidaigeki (period dramas) and contemporary dramas on television and film, as well as variety shows. Fans of Abarenbō Shōgun immediately recognize him as the scheming Tokugawa Muneharu, arch-rival of the eighth shogun Yoshimune. He played the role for twenty years. Film appearances include five episodes in the series Gokudō no Onna-tachi and six Godzilla movies. He also acted in the 1992 Juzo Itami film Minbo: the Gentle Art of Japanese Extortion.

In 2015, Nakao won the award for best supporting actor of Tokyo Sports Film Award for his role in Ryuzo and the Seven Henchmen.

Filmography

Film
  (1964)
 The Vampire Doll (1970)
 Death at an Old Mansion (1975)
 Kaerazaru hibi (1978)
 Nihon no Fixer (1979)
 Shikake-nin Baian (1981)
 Ninja Wars (1982)
 Minbo: the Gentle Art of Japanese Extortion (1992)
 Godzilla vs. Mechagodzilla II (1993), Takaki Aso
 Godzilla vs. SpaceGodzilla (1994), Takaki Aso
 Godzilla vs. Destoroyah (1995), Takaki Aso]
 Hissatsu! Shamisenya no Yuji (1999)
 Godzilla Against Mechagodzilla (2002), Hayato Igarashi
 Godzilla: Tokyo S.O.S. (2003), Hayato Igarashi
 Godzilla: Final Wars (2004), original Gotengo captain
 Achilles and the Tortoise (2008), art collector
 Hagetaka: The Movie (The Vulture) (2009)
 Inu to Anata no Monogatari (2011)
 Outrage Beyond (2012), gangster
 Heroine Shikkaku (2015), Himself
 Ryuzo and the Seven Henchmen (2015), Mokichi
 Tonde Saitama (2019)
 Ninkyō Gakuen (2019)
 Let's Talk About the Old Times (2022), himself

Television
Shin Heike Monogatari (1972) - Taira no Tadanori
Castle of Sand (1977)
 Ai no Arashi (1986), Saegusa Den'emon (Japanese adaptation of Wuthering Heights)
 Homura Tatsu (1993–94) - Emperor Go-Shirakawa
 Shonan Junai-gumi! (1995) - Principal Dokudai Tokiaritsune
 Hideyoshi (1996) - Shibata Katsuie
 Great Teacher Onizuka (1998) - Hiroshi Uchiyamada
 Yoshitsune (2005) - Kajiwara Kagetoki
 Tenchijin (2009) - Mōri Terumoto
 Ryōmaden (2010) - Shigeta Ichijirō
 Saka no Ue no Kumo - (2010) - Hidaka Sōnojō

Video Games
 Judge Eyes (2018) - Ryuzo Genda 
 Lost Judgment'' (2021) - Ryuzo Genda

Awards
 1980: Bronze Award at Le Salon exhibition in France
 1981: Grand Prix at Le Salon exhibition in France
 1982: International Award at Le Salon exhibition in France

References

External links
 Agency profile 

Akira Nakao at Toho Kingdom

1942 births
Living people
Japanese male film actors
Japanese male television actors
People from Kisarazu
Actors from Chiba Prefecture
Artists from Chiba Prefecture
20th-century Japanese male actors
21st-century Japanese male actors